This is a complete list of the twenty five patents issued by the U.S. Patent Office to  Hendrik Wade Bode for his inventions. The broad areas of his patents include transmission networks, transformer systems, electric wave amplification, broadband amplifiers and artillery computing.

References 

Bode, Hendrik Wade
United States science-related lists